David Peter Sawyerr (born 6 May 1961) is a Sierra Leonean sprinter. He competed in the men's 200 metres at the 1984 Summer Olympics.

References

External links
 

1961 births
Living people
Athletes (track and field) at the 1984 Summer Olympics
Athletes (track and field) at the 1988 Summer Olympics
Sierra Leonean male sprinters
Sierra Leone Creole people
Olympic athletes of Sierra Leone
Place of birth missing (living people)